The 2023 NCAA Division I men's ice hockey tournament will be the national championship tournament for men's college ice hockey in the United States scheduled for March 23-April 8, 2023. The tournament will involve 16 teams in single-elimination play to determine the national champion at the Division I level of the National Collegiate Athletic Association (NCAA), the highest level of competition in college hockey. The tournament's Frozen Four—the semifinals and finals—will be hosted by Hockey East at the Amalie Arena in Tampa, Florida.

Tournament procedure

The tournament is composed of four groups of four teams in regional brackets.  The four regionals are officially named after their geographic areas.  The following are the sites for the 2023 regionals:

Regional semifinals and finals
March 23 & 25
East Regional, SNHU Arena – Manchester, New Hampshire (Host: New Hampshire)
West Regional, Scheels Arena – Fargo, North Dakota (Host: North Dakota) 
March 24 & 26
Northeast Regional, Total Mortgage Arena – Bridgeport, Connecticut (Host: Yale) 
Midwest Regional, PPL Center – Allentown, Pennsylvania (Host: Penn State)

National semifinals and championship (Frozen Four and championship)
April 6–8
Amalie Arena – Tampa, Florida (Host: Wisconsin)

Qualifying teams

The at-large bids and seeding for each team in the tournament was announced on March 19, 2023 on ESPNU.

The Big Ten and ECAC each received four, the NCHC received three, the CCHA and Hockey East both received two, and one team from Atlantic Hockey received a berth.

Number in parentheses denotes overall seed in the tournament.

Tournament bracket 

* denotes overtime period

Results
Note: All game times are local.

West Region – Fargo, North Dakota

Regional semifinals

Northeast Region – Bridgeport, Connecticut

Regional semifinals

Midwest Region – Allentown, Pennsylvania

Regional semifinals

East Region – Manchester, New Hampshire

Regional semifinals

References

 

 
NCAA Division I men's ice hockey tournament
NCAA Division I men's ice hockey tournament
NCAA Division I men's ice hockey tournament
College sports tournaments in Florida
Ice hockey competitions in Florida
Ice hockey competitions in Bridgeport, Connecticut
Ice hockey competitions in New Hampshire
Ice hockey competitions in North Dakota
Ice hockey competitions in Pennsylvania